Quarit (Amharic: ቋሪት ) is one of the woredas in the Amhara Region of Ethiopia. Part of the Mirab Gojjam Zone, Quarit is bordered on the southwest by Jabi Tehnan, on the west by Sekela, on the north by Yilmana Densa, on the east by the Misraq Gojjam Zone, and on the southeast by Dega Damot. The major town in Quarit is Gebeze Mariam. Goncha woreda was separated from Quarit.

The highest point in this woreda and in the West Gojjam Zone is Mount Amedamit , a part of the Choqa Mountains, with an elevation of 3619 meters. Mount Adama, from which the river Birr one of the tributaries of Blue Nile river starts its flow is one of the highest picks in the woreda. It was at the foot of this mountain that the Battle of Amedamit was fought on 6 October 1620 between Ras Sela Kristos, half-brother of the Emperor Susenyos of Ethiopia, and a group of rebels who opposed Susenyos' Pro-Catholic beliefs. The rebels were crushed.

Demographics
Based on the 2007 national census conducted by the Central Statistical Agency of Ethiopia (CSA), this woreda has a total population of 114,771, an increase of -16.49% over the 1994 census, of whom 56,767 are men and 58,004 women; 4,750 or 4.14% are urban inhabitants. With an area of 602.99 square kilometers, Quarit has a population density of 190.34, which is greater than the Zone average of 158.25 persons per square kilometer. A total of 25,402 households were counted in this woreda, resulting in an average of 4.52 persons to a household, and 24,927 housing units. The majority of the inhabitants practiced Ethiopian Orthodox Christianity, with 99.96% reporting that as their religion.

The 1994 national census reported a total population for this woreda of 137,437 in 27,875 households, of whom 69,044 were men and 68,393 were women; 2,008 or 1.46% of its population were urban dwellers. The largest ethnic group reported in Quarit was the Amhara (99.95%). Amharic was spoken as a first language by 99.9%. The majority of the inhabitants practiced Ethiopian Orthodox Christianity, with 99.9% reporting that as their religion.

Tourist attractions 
 Haregewoyin cave, which is over 10 kilometer in its distance and very attractive. Used by the local people as a shelter during the summer season. 
 Gragn Ahmed standing land stone
 Ambaw washa

References

Districts of Amhara Region